The Bisexual Book Awards are an annual literary award program, presented by the Bi Writers Association to honour the year's best works of literature addressing themes of bisexuality. The awards were presented for the first time in 2013.

Awards are presented in 11 categories, where any writer who has addressed bisexual themes in their work may be submitted for consideration regardless of their own sexual orientation. Two special awards are also presented: the Bi Book Publisher Award to the publishing company that has submitted the most books to the awards program that year, and the Bi Writer Award for the best book by an out bisexual writer.

2013

Bisexual Fiction
 John Irving, In One Person
Ellis Avery, The Last Nude
Annette Lapointe, Whitetail Shooting Gallery
Catherine Lundoff, Silver Moon
Lee Mandelo, Beyond Binary: Genderqueer and Sexually Fluid Speculative Fiction
Richard Mason, History of a Pleasure Seeker
Basil Papademos, Mount Royal

Bisexual Non-fiction
 Cheryl Burke, My Awesome Place: The Autobiography of Cheryl B
Janet W. Hardy, Girlfag: A Life Told in Sex and Musicals

Bisexual Poetry
 Erynn Rowan Laurie, Fireflies at Absolute Zero
Donnelle McGee, Shine
Yazmin Monet Watkins, Love Without Limits: The Bi-Laws of Love

Bisexual Erotic Fiction
 Basil Papademos, Mount Royal
Mykola Dementiuk, Times Square Queer: Tales of Bad Boys in the Big Apple
Cecilia Tan, The Poet and the Prophecy: Magic University Book Four

Bisexual Speculative Fiction [Science Fiction/Fantasy/Horror]
 Lee Mandelo, Beyond Binary: Genderqueer and Sexually Fluid Speculative Fiction
Fiona Glass, Gleams of a Remoter World
Cecilia Tan, The Poet and the Prophecy: Magic University Book Four
Catherine Lundoff, Silver Moon

Bi Writer of the Year
 Cheryl Burke, My Awesome Place: The Autobiography of Cheryl B
Mykola Dementiuk, Times Square Queer: Tales of Bad Boys in the Big Apple
Janet W. Hardy, Girlfag: A Life Told in Sex and Musicals
Annette Lapointe, Whitetail Shooting Gallery
Erynn Rowan Laurie, Fireflies at Absolute Zero
Catherine Lundoff, Silver Moon
Lee Mandelo, Beyond Binary: Genderqueer and Sexually Fluid Speculative Fiction
Basil Papademos, Mount Royal
Cecilia Tan, The Poet and the Prophecy: Magic University Book Four

Bisexual Book Publisher of the Year
 Lethe Press, Riptide Publishing and Sibling Rivalry Press

2014

Bisexual Fiction
 Manil Suri, The City of Devi
Susan Choi, My Education
Nicola Griffith, Hild
David Leavitt, The Two Hotel Francforts
Frank Anthony Polito, The Spirit of Detroit
Bushra Rehman, Corona
Arlene Schindler, The Last Place She’d Look

Bisexual Non-fiction
 Charles "Zan" Christensen, Anything That Loves: Comics Beyond Gay and Straight
Shiri Eisner, Bi: Notes for a Bisexual Revolution
Marina Peralta and Penelope James, Barriers to Love: Embracing a Bisexual Identity
Maria San Filippo, The B Word: Bisexuality in Contemporary Film and Television
Jade Sylvan, Kissing Oscar Wilde: A Love Story in the City of Light

Bisexual Speculative Fiction
 Laura Lam, Pantomime
Francesca Lia Block, Love in The Time of Global Warming
Alaya Dawn Johnson, The Summer Prince
Malinda Lo, Inheritance
Saundra Mitchell, The Elementals
Mary Anne Mohanraj, The Stars Change
Emma Trevayne, Coda

Bisexual Teen/Young Adult Fiction
 Malinda Lo, Inheritance
Francesca Lia Block, Love in The Time of Global Warming
M. G. Higgins, Bi-Normal
Alaya Dawn Johnson, The Summer Prince
Bill Konigsberg, Openly Straight
Laura Lam, Pantomime

Bisexual Biography/Memoir
 Alden Jones, The Blind Masseuse: A Traveler’s Memoir from Costa Rica to Cambodia
Charles "Zan" Christensen, Anything That Loves: Comics Beyond Gay and Straight
Marina Peralta and Penelope James, Barriers to Love: Embracing a Bisexual Identity

Bisexual Erotic Fiction
 Adriana Kraft, The Reunion
Rachel Kramer Bussel, Twice the Pleasure: Bisexual Women’s Erotica
Livia Ellis, Memoirs of a Gigolo Omnibus
Jean Roberta, The Flight of the Black Swan
Elizabeth Schechter, House of Sable Locks

Bi Writer of the Year
 Shiri Eisner, Bi: Notes for a Bisexual Revolution
Rachel Kramer Bussel, Twice the Pleasure: Bisexual Women’s Erotica
Clive Davis with Anthony DeCurtis, The Soundtrack of My Life
Livia Ellis, Memoirs of a Gigolo Omnibus
Ed Kurtz, A Wind of Knives
Marina Peralta and Penelope James, Barriers to Love: Embracing a Bisexual Identity
Jean Roberta, The Flight of the Black Swan

Bisexual Book Publisher of the Year
 Circlet Press and Riverdale Avenue Books

2015

Bisexual Fiction
 Courtney Moreno, In Case of Emergency
Emma Donoghue, Frog Music
Sheela Lambert, Best Bi Short Stories
Vivek Shraya, She of the Mountains
Sarah Waters, The Paying Guests

Bisexual Non-fiction
 Robyn Ochs and H. Sharif Williams, Recognize: The Voices of Bisexual Men
Jacob Anderson-Minshall and Diane Anderson-Minshall, Queerly Beloved: A Love Story Across Gender
Charles M. Blow, Fire Shut Up in My Bones
Breanne Fahs, Valerie Solanas: The Defiant Life of the Woman Who Wrote SCUM (and Shot Andy Warhol)
Daisy Hernández, A Cup of Water Under My Bed
Edward White, The Tastemaker: Carl Van Vechten and the Birth of Modern America

Bisexual Romance
 Shari Slade and Amber Lin, One Kiss with a Rock Star
Shira Glassman, Climbing the Date Palm
Debbie McGowan, Crying in the Rain
May Woodworth, Heart of the Hurricane
L. C. Chase, Let it Ride
Jenna Galicki, The Prince of Punk Rock (Radical Rock Stars Book One)

Bisexual Erotic Fiction
 Julie Cox, Capricious: A Texan Tale of Love and Magic
Megan Mulry, Bound to Be a Groom
Livia Ellis, Memoirs of a Gigolo, Second Omnibus
Jamie Fessenden, Murder on the Mountain
Shari Slade and Amber Lin, One Kiss with a Rock Star

Bisexual Speculative Fiction
 Corinne Duyvis, Otherbound
Julie Cox, Capricious: A Texan Tale of Love and Magic
Shira Glassman, Climbing the Date Palm
Sarah Luddington, The Pendragon Legacy
Alex Jeffers, That Door is a Mischief

Bisexual Memoir/Biography
 Daisy Hernández, A Cup of Water Under My Bed
Allison Moon, Bad Dyke
Charles M. Blow, Fire Shut Up in My Bones
Alan Cumming, Not My Father’s Son
Daniel Schreiber, Susan Sontag: A Biography
Edward White, The Tastemaker: Carl Van Vechten and the Birth of Modern America

Bisexual Teen/Young Adult Fiction
 Nora Olsen, Frenemy of the People
Corinne Duyvis, Otherbound

Bisexual Mystery
 Jamie Fessenden, Murder on the Mountain
A. R. Fiano, The Book of Joel

Bisexual Poetry
 Laura Foley, Joy Street
James Franco, Directing Herbert White

Bisexual Anthology
 Robyn Ochs and H. Sharif Williams, Recognize: The Voices of Bisexual Men
Rachel Kramer Bussel, Big Book of Submission: 69 Kinky Tales

Bi Writer of the Year
 Robyn Ochs and H. Sharif Williams, Recognize: The Voices of Bisexual Men
Sheela Lambert, Best Bi Short Stories
Daisy Hernández, A Cup of Water Under My Bed
Charles M. Blow, Fire Shut Up in My Bones
Livia Ellis, Memoirs of a Gigolo, Second Omnibus
Alan Cumming, Not My Father’s Son

Bisexual Book Publisher of the Year
 Bisexual Resource Center, Circlet Press, Cleis Press and Riverdale Avenue Books

2016

Fiction
 Lidia Yuknavitch, The Small Backs of Children
Jennifer Steil, The Ambassador's Wife
Redfern Jon Barrett, The Giddy Death of the Gays & the Strange Demise of Straights
Kelly Gardiner, Goddess
Anna North, The Life and Death of Sophie Stark

Non-Fiction
 Maria Pallotta-Chiarolli, Bisexuality in Education: Erasure, Exclusion and the Absence of Intersectionality
Surya Monro, Bisexuality: Identities, Politics, and Theories
Jillian Deri, Love's Refraction: Jealousy and Compersion in Queer Women's Polyamorous Relationships

Memoir/Biography
 Kate Evans, Call It Wonder: An Odyssey of Love, Sex, Spirit, and Travel
Chelsey Clammer, BodyHome
Emily Bingham, Irrepressible: The Jazz Age Life of Henrietta Bingham

Romance
 Megan Mulry, Bound with Honor
Avon Gale, Breakaway
J. L. Merrow, Caught!
Amy Jo Cousins, The Girl Next Door
Tess Bowery, She Whom I Love
Francis Gideon, A Winter in Rome

Erotic Fiction
 Heidi Belleau and Sam Schooler, Dead Ringer
Lauren Gallagher, Kneel, Mr. President
Avon Gale, Let the Wrong Light In
Tess Bowery, She Whom I Love
Santino Hassell, Sunset Park (Five Boroughs #2)
Lauren E. Mitchell, The Triad Trial

Speculative Fiction
 B. R. Sanders, Ariah
Megan Derr, The Harem Master
Shira Glassman, A Harvest of Ripe Figs
Michelle Moore and Reesa Herberth, Peripheral People
C. B. Lee, Seven Tears at High Tide
Lori A. Witt, The Tide of War

Teen/YA Fiction
 Hannah Moskowitz, Not Otherwise Specified
Erica Yang, Bad Idea
Casey Lawrence, Out of Order
C. B. Lee, Seven Tears at High Tide

Mystery
 Michelle Moore and Reesa Herberth, Peripheral People
Casey Lawrence, Out of Order

Poetry
 Jennifer Perrine, No Confession, No Mass
Maureen Seaton and Denise Duhamel, Caprice

Bi Writer of the Year
 Kate Evans, Call It Wonder: An Odyssey of Love, Sex, Spirit, and Travel
B. R. Sanders, Ariah
Hannah Moscowitz, Not Otherwise Specified

Publisher of the Year
 Less Than Three Press and Macmillan Publishers

2017

Fiction
Susan Wittig Albert, Loving Eleanor
Georgia Clark, The Regulars
Erin Judge, Vow of Celibacy

Non-Fiction
Tiggy Upland and Jennifer L. Bonardi, Advice from a Wild Deuce: The Best of Ask Tiggy
Eric Anderson and Mark McCormack, The Changing Dynamics of Bisexual Men's Lives: Social Research Perspectives
Maria Pallotta-Chiarolli, Women in Relationships with Bisexual Men: Bi Men By Women

Memoir/Biography
Juliet Nicolson, A House Full of Daughters
Ira Nadel, Virginia Woolf

Romance
 Garrett Leigh, What Remains
 Jordan Brock, Change of Address
 J. L. Merrow, Lovers Leap
 Keelan Ellis, Misinformation
 Dahlia Adler, Out on Good Behavior
 Lauren Sattersby, Rock N Soul
 Lauren Gallagher, Stuck Landing

Erotic Fiction
 Lauren Gallgher, The Best Laid Plans
 J. A. Rock, 24/7
 Nicole Wood, Club Trega
 Vanessa Clark, The Man on Top of the World

Speculative Fiction
 Megan Derr, The Painted Crown
 Foz Meadows, An Accident of Stars
 Sasha L. Miller (editor), Enchanted Soles
 Archer Kay Leah, For the Clan
 Zoraida Cordova, Labyrinth Lost
 K. C. Alexander, Necrotech
 Julia Ember,   The Seafarer's Kiss

Teen/YA Fiction
 Alison Cherry, Look Both Ways
 Jamie Deacon, Caught Inside
 C. B. Lee, Not Your Sidekick
 Suzanne van Rooyen, Obscura Burning
 Casey Lawrence, Order in the Court
 Dahlia Adler, Out on Good Behavior
 Emily O'Beirne, The Sum of these Things

Mystery
 Erica Cameron, Assassins: Discord
 Casey Lawrence, Order in the Court

Poetry
  Ann Tweedy, The Body's Alphabet
 Cathleen Chambless, Nec(Romantic)

Graphic Novel/Memoir
 Tyler Cohen, Primahood: Magenta
 Jon Macy and Tara Madison Avery (editors), ALPHABET: The LGBTQAIU Creators from Prism Comics

Anthology
 Sasha L. Miller (editor), Enchanted Soles
 Jon Macy and Tara Madison Avery (editors), ALPHABET: The LGBTQAIU Creators from Prism Comics

Bi Writer of the Year
 Tiggy Upland and Jennifer L. Bonardi, Advice from a Wild Deuce: The Best of Ask Tiggy
 Lauren Gallgher, The Best Laid Plans
 Ann Tweedy, The Body's Alphabet
 Suzanne van Rooyen, Obscura Burning
 Erin Judge, Vow of Celibacy
 Garrett Leigh, What Remains

Publisher of the Year
 Dreamspinner Press, Less Than Three Press and Riptide Publishing

2018

Fiction 
Elaine Castillo, America Is Not the Heart
Jennifer Natalya Fink, Bhopal Dance
Alan Robert Clark, The Prince of Mirrors
Elizabeth J. Colen and Carol Guess, True Ash
Emily Strelow, The Wild Birds

Non-Fiction 
Michael Amherst, Go the Way Your Blood Beats: On Truth, Bisexuality, and Desire
Sophie Lucido Johnson, Many Love

Memoir/Biography 

 Sophie Lucido Johnson, Many Love
 Charlie Harmon, On the Road and Off the Record with Leonard Bernstein

Romance 

 Felicia Davin, Edge of Nowhere
 Lilah Suzanne, Jilted
 Layla Reyne, Medley (Changing Lanes)
 Nem Rowan, Rough Sleepers
 Michele Engardt, The Thing About Forever
 L.A. Witt, The Torches We Carry

Erotic Fiction 

 Lexi Mohney, Carnal Knowledge
 M.K. Lee, Whatever Comes First

Speculative Fiction 

 Jeanne G'Fellers, Cleaning House
 Megan Derr, Dragon Magic
 William C. Tracy, The Seeds of Dissolution
 Felicia Davin, Etymon Press
 J.R. Mabry, The Worship of Mystery

Teen/YA Fiction 

 Gene Gant, A Love Song for Mr. Dakota
 J.E. Sumerau, Palmetto Rose
 Lisa Walker, Paris Syndrome
 Cat Clarke, We Are Young
 Mia Kerick, The Weekend Bucket List

Mystery 

 Alexandra CH Nowakowski and JE Sumerau, Other People's Oysters
 Cari Z & L.A. Witt, Reckless Behavior
 Cat Clarke, We Are Young
 Kristen Lepionka, What You Want to See
 Rosalie Knecht, Who Is Vera Kelly?

Poetry 

 Britteney Black Rose Kapri, Black Queer Hoe
 Diana Hamilton, God Was Right
 Jan Steckel, Like Flesh Covers Bone
 Julian Randall, Refuse
 Duy Doan, We Play a Game

Publisher of the Year 

 Less Than Three Press

References

External links

LGBT literary awards
American literary awards
Awards established in 2013
2013 establishments in the United States
LGBT literature in the United States
Bisexuality-related literature
Bisexual culture in the United States